Marilyn Hamilton (born 1949) is a paralympic skier and wheelchair tennis player. She developed sports wheelchairs. She competed at the 1988 Winter Paralympics, winning a silver medal.

Life 

She was injured in a hang gliding accident in the California Sierra Mountains in 1978. A year later, she co-founded the Quickie wheelchair company. She developed light weight sports wheelchairs, using hang gliding parts.

She competed at the 1982 US Open Wheelchair Tennis Singles Champion, and 1983 US Open Wheelchair Tennis Singles Champion, winning the championship.

At the 1988 Paralympic Winter Games in Innsbruck, she finished second with a time of 1:39.48, in the Women's Slalom LW10, behind Françoise Jacquerod, gold medal in 1:14.65 and ahead of Emiko Ikeda, in 1:52.32. She competed in the Women's Slalom LW10, but did not finish.

References

External links 

 Official website

1949 births
Living people
People from Dinuba, California
Paralympic alpine skiers of the United States
American female alpine skiers
Alpine skiers at the 1988 Winter Paralympics
Medalists at the 1988 Winter Paralympics
Paralympic silver medalists for the United States